{{Infobox nobility title
| name              = Marquessate of Downshire 
| image             =  
| image_size        =  
| alt               =  
| caption           = Arms: Quarterly, 1st, Sable, on a Fess Argent, between three Leopards passant guardant Or, spotted of the field, as many Escallops Gules (for HILL); 2nd, Party per bend sinister Ermine and Ermines, a Lion rampant Or (for TREVOR); 3rd, Gules, a Quatrefoil Or (for ROWE); 4th, Argent, a Chevron Azure, between three Trefoils slipped per pale Gules and Vert (for ROWE). Crest: A Reindeer's Head couped Gules, attired and plain collared Or. Supporters: Dexter: a Leopard Or, spotted Sable, ducally gorged and chained Gules. Sinister: a Reindeer Gules, attired unguled and plain collared Or.| creation_date     = 20 August 1789 
| creation          =  
| monarch           = George III 
| peerage           = Peerage of Ireland 
| baronetage        =  
| first_holder      = Wills Hill, 1st Marquess of Downshire 
| last_holder       =  
| present_holder    = Arthur Nicholas Hill, 9th Marquess of Downshire 
| heir_apparent     = Edmund Hill, Earl of Hillsborough 
| heir_presumptive  =  
| remainder_to      = The 1st Marquess' heirs male of the body lawfully begotten 
| subsidiary_titles = Earl of Hillsborough (I)Earl of Hillsborough (GB)Viscount HillsboroughViscount KilwarlinViscount FairfordBaron HillBaron HarwichBaron Sandys (UK) 
| status            = Extant 
| extinction_date   =  
| family_seat       = Clifton Castle 
| former_seat       = Hillsborough CastleEasthampstead Park 
| motto             = PER DEUM FERRUM OBTINUI (By God and my sword I have obtained)  NE TENTES AUT PERFICE (Either attempt not, or accomplish) 
| footnotes         =  
}}

Marquess of Downshire is a title in the Peerage of Ireland. It was created in 1789 for Wills Hill, 1st Earl of Hillsborough, a former Secretary of State.

Hill had already been created Earl of Hillsborough and Viscount Kilwarlin of County Down in the Peerage of Ireland in 1751 with remainder, in default of male issue of his own, to his uncle Arthur Hill, 1st Viscount Dungannon. He was further created Baron Harwich, of Harwich in the County of Essex, in the Peerage of Great Britain in 1756 with a seat in the British House of Lords. In 1772 he was further ennobled with a second Earldom of Hillsborough and as Viscount Fairford in the County of Gloucester, both in the Peerage of Great Britain.

Downshire was the eldest son of Trevor Hill, who had been created Viscount Hillsborough and Baron Hill of Kilwarlin in County Down, in the Peerage of Ireland in 1717, with remainder, in default of male issue of his own, to the male issue of his father, Michael Hill. Trevor Hill was the brother of the aforementioned Arthur Hill, 1st Viscount Dungannon.

In 2013, the 9th Marquess succeeded, under the terms of a special remainder of 1802, to the title Baron Sandys. The barony had been created for Mary Hill, Marchioness of Downshire, the widow of the second Marquess, with remainder to her younger sons, Lord Arthur Moyses William Hill, Lord Marcus Hill, Lord Augustus Hill and Lord George Hill successively, but if the male line failed, could be inherited by her male heirs of the eldest son, the third Marquess. This occurred in April 2013 with the death of Richard Hill, 7th Baron Sandys without male heirs.

Prior to the passage of the House of Lords Act 1999, the Marquesses sat in the House of Lords as the Earls of Hillsborough.

Among many other estates, the Marquess owned Hillsborough Castle, the Blessington Estate in County Wicklow, and Easthampstead Park near Bracknell. The Marquesses are also Hereditary Constables of Hillsborough Fort.

The present family seat is Clifton Castle, near Masham, North Yorkshire.

Ancestors
Sir Moyses Hill, knight (died February 1630) came to Ireland as a soldier under the Earl of Essex.
Arthur Hill (died April 1663) a colonel under Charles I, MP for Counties of Down, Antrim, and Armagh in the First Protectorate Parliament of 1654-5, appointed Constable of Hillsborough Castle in 1660, MP for County Down from 1661.
William Hill (died 1693) succeeded to the Hillsborough estates on the death of his elder half-brother Moyses Hill, and was a Privy Councillor under Charles II and James II and Member of the Irish Parliament for Ballyshannon from 1661 until 1666.
Michael Hill (c.1662–1699) was a Privy Councillor, and a Member of Parliament for Saltash and for Hillsborough.  He married Ann, daughter and eventual heir of Sir John Trevor, Master of the Rolls and Speaker of the House of Commons.

Viscounts Hillsborough (1717)titles: Viscount Hillsborough and Baron Hill of Kilwarlin (1717)Trevor Hill, 1st Viscount Hillsborough  (1693–1742)
Wills Hill, 2nd Viscount Hillsborough (1718–1793) (created Earl of Hillsborough in 1751)

Earl of Hillsborough (1751 & 1772)titles: Viscount Hillsborough and Baron Hill of Kilwarlin (1717), Earl of Hillsborough [Ireland] (1751), Baron Harwich (1756), Earl of Hillsborough [Great Britain] and Viscount Fairford (1772)Wills Hill, 1st Earl of Hillsborough (1718–1793) (created Marquess of Downshire in 1789)

Marquesses of Downshire (1789)titles: Marquess of Downshire (1789), plus titles above; additionally Baron Sandys (1802) from 2013Wills Hill, 1st Marquess of Downshire (1718–1793)
Arthur Hill, 2nd Marquess of Downshire (1753–1801)
Arthur Blundell Sandys Trumbull Hill, 3rd Marquess of Downshire (1788–1845)
Arthur Wills Blundell Sandys Trumbull Windsor Hill, 4th Marquess of Downshire (1812–1868)
Arthur Wills Blundell Trumbull Sandys Roden Hill, 5th Marquess of Downshire (1844–1874)
Arthur Wills John Wellington Trumbull Blundell Hill, 6th Marquess of Downshire (1871–1918)
Arthur Wills Percy Wellington Blundell Trumbull Hill, 7th Marquess of Downshire (1894–1989)
Arthur Robin Ian Hill, 8th Marquess of Downshire (1929–2003)
Arthur Francis Nicholas Wills Hill, 9th Marquess of Downshire, 8th Baron Sandys (born 1959)

The heir apparent is the present holder's son Edmund Robin Arthur Hill, Earl of Hillsborough (born 1996).

Line of succession

 Arthur Hill, 3rd Marquess of Downshire (1788–1845) Arthur Hill, 4th Marquess of Downshire (1812–1868) Arthur Hill, 5th Marquess of Downshire (1844–1874) Arthur Hill, 6th Marquess of Downshire (1871–1918)Lord Arthur Francis Henry Hill (1895–1953) Arthur Hill, 8th Marquess of Downshire (1929–2003) Arthur Hill, 9th Marquess of Downshire (b. 1959)
(1). Edmund Hill, Earl of Hillsborough (b. 1996)
(2).  Lord Anthony Ian Hill (b. 1961)
(3).  Marcus Robert Francis Hill (b. 1994)
(4).  Orlando Harry Wills Hill (b. 1997)
(5). George Oliver Percy Hill (b. 2000)
 (Arthur) Edwin Hill-Trevor, 1st Baron Trevor (1819–1894) Barons Trevor''

Family tree

See also
Viscount Dungannon
Baron Sandys
Baron Trevor

References

Attribution

External links

Marquessates in the Peerage of Ireland
Marquess
1789 establishments in Ireland
Noble titles created in 1789
Marquesses of Downshire